SmartAction provides artificial intelligence-based voice self-service.  IVA is a cloud-based, hosted service. The company was founded by inventor and entrepreneur Peter Voss and is headquartered in El Segundo, California.

History 
In 2001, Peter Voss founded an R&D startup, Adaptive AI, Inc., to research and develop a prototype artificial general intelligence system based on his theory of intelligence. In 2009 Voss founded Smart Action Company, LLC to commercialize this technology. Created out of Voss' research and development, SmartAction created its first practical application of this new technology focused on the management of inbound and outbound calls for contact centers.

Technology 
The company provides a Voice Registration platform that uses natural language speech recognition and is based on an object-oriented coding framework. This platforms utilises a proprietary AI engine drive the conversation with the caller, intended to improve over time. The platform is intended to make development and updates to the system quicker than older technology by using built-in knowledge and skills.

See also 

 Artificial Intelligence
 Interactive voice response
 Speech recognition
 Speech synthesis (text-to-speech (TTS))
 Contact center

References

Further reading 
  Amazon.com page
 The First Conference on Artificial General Intelligence

Applications of artificial intelligence
User interface techniques
Telephony
Telephone services
Call centre companies